Viktor Arsenevich Kapitonov (25 October 1933 – 5 March 2005) was a Soviet road cyclist who competed at the 1956 and 1960 Summer Olympics. In 1956 he finished 32nd individually and 6th with the Soviet team. In 1960 he won the individual road race and finished third in the 100 km team time trial. His gold medal was the first for Soviet cyclists. At the end of the race Kapitonov mistakenly sprinted for the finish with one lap to go, surprising his main rival Livio Trapè. In the last lap Trapè sprinted first, but Kapitonov caught him up in the last few meters.

Kapitonov was part of the Soviet teams that won the Peace Race in 1958, 1959, 1961 and 1962. He retired in 1965 and until 1985 coached the Soviet road racing team. In 1983 he defended a PhD in pedagogy.

References

External links

 profile 

1933 births
2005 deaths
Soviet male cyclists
Olympic cyclists of the Soviet Union
Olympic gold medalists for the Soviet Union
Olympic bronze medalists for the Soviet Union
Cyclists at the 1956 Summer Olympics
Cyclists at the 1960 Summer Olympics
Olympic medalists in cycling
Sportspeople from Tver
Russian male cyclists
Medalists at the 1960 Summer Olympics
Burials in Troyekurovskoye Cemetery